Microcylloepus pusillus is a species of riffle beetle in the family Elmidae. It is found in North America.

Subspecies
These six subspecies belong to the species Microcylloepus pusillus:
 Microcylloepus pusillus aptus (Musgrave, 1933)
 Microcylloepus pusillus foveatus (LeConte, 1874)
 Microcylloepus pusillus loedingi (Musgrave, 1933)
 Microcylloepus pusillus perditus (Musgrave, 1933)
 Microcylloepus pusillus pusillus (LeConte, 1852)
 Microcylloepus pusillus similis (Horn, 1870)

References

Further reading

 
 

Elmidae
Articles created by Qbugbot
Beetles described in 1852